TTMV refers to:

 Torque teno mini viruses, known as Betatorquevirus
 Torque teno midi virus, also known as transfusion transmitted midi virus and typically abbreviated TTMDV, members of Gammatorquevirus